The Umeå Institute of Technology or Tekniska högskolan i Umeå is part of the Faculty of Science and Technology at Umeå University. The Institute offers a wide range of study programmes, some of them not to be found in any other part of Sweden. Research in engineering is gradually being expanded. The faculty's traditionally strong position in natural sciences form a base on which new technology research is built.

Umeå Institute of Technology three main areas in research are Information and Interaction Technologies, Life Sciences, and Sustainable Society.

History

The 1964/65 academic year saw the beginning of what was to become the current Faculty of Sciences and Technology with the creation of a Faculty of Philosophy, which was later divided into a Faculty of Mathematics and Natural Science and a Faculty of Social Science in 1968/69.

There was already talk in 1964 of establishing a technical college in Umeå. Nothing definite came out of these discussions until 1 July 1997 when the Umeå Institute of Technology was established.

Engineering programmes were gradually developed at the university during the 1980s in the form of two engineering programmes. The first master's programmes at Umeå University were in engineering physics in 1988. Central to the development of Master's programmes in engineering has always been strong basic sciences, e.g. chemistry, physics, biology and computing science.

Education

Master's programmes in Computing Science and Engineering, Engineering Chemistry and Engineering Biology were introduced during the nineties. At the end of the eighties and beginning of the nineties a series of two-year engineering programmes were started. These later developed into three-year university engineering programmes. The newest of the engineering programmes is the Master's Programme in Energy Engineering.

The 1990s have seen the establishment of a number of centres for research. The goal has been to create centres where researchers from different fields are able to collaborate on common issues.

Departments

Applied Physics and Electronics 
Chemistry
Computing Science
Ecology and Environmental Science
Institute of Design
Space Science
Mathematics and Mathematical Statistics
Molecular Biology
Physics
Plant Physiology

Research Centres

The Faculty of Science and Technology at Umeå University has over 5,500 students and more than 350 research students. Research and education is gathered under ten different departments. Several centres have also been established to ensure even more effective research.

The Faculty of Medicine and the Swedish University of Agricultural Sciences (SLU) are two of the Faculty of Science and Technology's most important partners. Collaboration also takes place with a number of universities in Sweden. Interfaces naturally extend beyond Sweden's borders; there are for instance established collaborations with INRA, the National Institute for Agricultural Research in France, and Oxford University.

Research Centers:
Umeå Center for Molecular Patogenesis - UCMP
Umeå Plant Science Centre - UPSC
Umeå Life Science Centre - ULSC
Umeå Centre for Interaction Technology - UCIT
High Performance Computing Center North - HPC2N
Centre for Biomedical Engineering and Physics
Intelligent Vehicles for Off-Road - IFOR
Umeå Marine Sciences Centre - UMF

See also
Umeå University 
Umeå Institute of Design
Luleå University of Technology 
Chalmers University of Technology,
Royal Institute of Technology,
List of universities in Sweden''

External links
Umeå Institute of Technology - Official site

Umeå University
University departments in Sweden
Technical universities and colleges in Sweden
Educational institutions established in 1997
Scientific organizations based in Sweden
1997 establishments in Sweden